Robert Hill House, also known as "Alley," was a historic home located at Kenton, Kent County, Delaware.  The house dated to the last decade of the 18th century, and was a two-story, three bay, side hall plan brick dwelling in the Federal style. It had a gable roof and the front facade features a simple entrance portico.  The rear wing was extended in the late-19th century with the addition of a frame wing.

It was listed on the National Register of Historic Places in 1983. The house was demolished between 2009 and 2011.

References

Houses on the National Register of Historic Places in Delaware
Federal architecture in Delaware
Houses completed in 1790
Houses in Kent County, Delaware
Kenton, Delaware
National Register of Historic Places in Kent County, Delaware